Senate Bill 149 (SB 149), officially called An Act to provide certain protections to faith-based or religious child-placement agencies, is a 2017 anti-LGBT law that was enacted in the state of South Dakota that permits taxpayer-funded agencies to deny services on the basis of religious exemptions.

Passage

On March 2, 2017, the South Dakota House of Representatives passed SB 149, with 43 ayes, 20 nays, and 7 excused votes. On March 7, 2017, the South Dakota Senate passed SB 149, with 27 ayes, and 8 nays. On May 10, 2017, Dennis Daugaard signed SB 149 into law, which became S.J. 746.

See also
 LGBT rights in South Dakota

References

2017 in American law
2017 in LGBT history
2017 in South Dakota
LGBT in South Dakota
Politics of South Dakota
South Dakota law